Killer's Moon is a 1978 British horror film written and directed by Alan Birkinshaw, with uncredited dialogue written by his novelist sister, Fay Weldon.

Plot
A coach full of schoolgirls breaks down in the Lake District, forcing the girls to take shelter for the night in a remote hotel. Meanwhile, strange and macabre things are happening to the locals (and their pets) and it is revealed that four escaped mental patients- Mr. Smith, Mr. Trubshaw, Mr. Muldoon and Mr. Jones - who have been dosed with LSD as part of their treatment, are roaming the area, convinced they are living a shared dream in which they are free to rape and murder - both of which they choose to do numerous times before the belated arrival of the police.

Cast
Anthony Forrest - Pete 
Tom Marshall - Mike 
Jane Hayden - Julie 
Alison Elliott - Sandy 
Georgina Kean - Agatha 
JoAnne Good - Mary
Nigel Gregory - Mr. Smith 
David Jackson - Mr. Trubshaw 
Paul Rattee - Mr. Muldoon 
Peter Spraggon  - Mr. Jones 
Jayne Lester - Elizabeth 
Lisa Vanderpump - Anne 
Debbie Martyn - Deirdre 
Christine Winter - Carol (credited as Christina Jones) 
Lynne Morgan - Sue  
Jean Reeve - Mrs. Hargreaves 
Elizabeth Counsell - Miss Lilac 
Hilda Braid - Mrs. May 
Chubby Oates - Bus Driver 
James Kerry - Psychiatrist
Hugh Ross - Government Minister

Background and history
During the mid-to-late 1970s, maverick directors such as Pete Walker and Norman J. Warren were trying to spice up the much-derided genre of British horror films.  These films would later be dubbed "New Wave" British horror, on account that they pushed the boundaries of taste as much as was possible within the British Board of Film Classification's strict regime and were set in modern-day 1970s Britain and centered on 20-30 aged protagonists, differing them from the predominantly period piece horrors of Hammer Films Productions that had gone before.  Alan Birkinshaw had begun his career in commercials, moving on to directing and producing Confessions of a Sex Maniac in 1974, and viewed making horror films as a natural progression. "we decided that the horror film (genre) was more up market than a sex comedy" he told Creeping Flesh in 2003.  Birkinshaw's film has been cited as combinings elements of Kubrick's A Clockwork Orange, the notorious American sleaze epic Carnal Madness (which was released in Britain as The Sizzlers), and a low-rent, late-period Carry On film.  However, by adding (faked) animal cruelty and the flippant treatment of rape, Birkinshaw created what was described in Matthew Sweet's book Shepperton Babylon as the most tasteless movie in British cinema history.

Killer's Moon was shot off season at Armathwaite Hall in the Lake District.  The eclectic  cast includes David Jackson, Jane Hayden (sister of cult actress Linda Hayden), JoAnne Good, future restaurateur Lisa Vanderpump, Hilda Braid, comedian Chubby Oates, and Hannah the three legged dog. Hannah the three legged dog in the film, was originally a pub dog who had lost a leg as the result of a shotgun wound sustained during an armed robbery.  She was later awarded the doggy Victoria Cross award for bravery.

The film was released in the Autumn of 1978 with the Charlton Heston/James Coburn film The Last Hard Men as a support feature, Killer's Moon also played in some cinemas as a supporting feature to the 1977 William Devane film Rolling Thunder.

Revival
In the late 1990s, Killer's Moon began to receive write-ups in magazines like Flesh and Blood and Nekrofile: Cinema of the Extreme.

Killer's Moon received a rare UK cinema screening in 2001 as part of the 'Ten Years of Terror' one-day film convention held at the Riverside Studios in Hammersmith, London.  The convention was a tie-in event for the publication of the book Ten Years of Terror: British Horror Films of the 1970s, which reprinted the Flesh and Blood review ("a film that flouts good taste and decency with crude bravado, remaining perversely entertaining".)

Creeping Flesh, a book format look at horror and fantasy films published by Headpress in 2003 carried a lengthy article on the film (‘Hungry in a Dream’) followed by an interview with Alan Birkinshaw.  Creeping Flesh was originally going to be titled Three Legged Dog, in honor of "Hannah, the pooch in Killer’s Moon", but the title was later changed because it was felt that the reference was too obscure. A motif of a three-legged dog, however, appears at the beginning of each chapter.

DVD release 
In 2008, Redemption Films released Killer's Moon on DVD in both the US and UK. The film was presented in a new remastered edition created from original materials and garnered critical acclaim. The release included a plethora of extras including director/cast interviews and an audio commentary featuring director Alan Birkinshaw, Radio London DJ JoAnne Good (who played one of the menaced schoolgirls) and moderator James Blackford. The film was passed uncut by the BBFC for the DVD release.

Birkinshaw was interviewed about the DVD release on JoAnne Good's BBC Radio Show (27 June) where he mentioned he was "in talks" to write and direct Killer's Moon 2.  Georgina Kean, who played Agatha, currently lives in Chiswick, West London.

Further reading
 Jones, Alan 1997 Nekrofile: Cinema of the Extreme (Midnight Media Publishing) 
 Fenton, Harvey 2001 Ten Years Of Terror: British Horror Films of the 1970s (FAB Press, Guildford)
 Kerekes, David 2003 Creeping Flesh Vol. 1: The Horror Fantasy Film Book (Headpress)

References

External links
 
 Review of the film from britishhorrorfilms.co.uk
 The BFI's page on Killer's Moon
 
 Armathwaite Hall Website
 Mondo Digital DVD review
 10k Bullets DVD review
 Lovelock and Load DVD review

1978 films
1978 horror films
1970s exploitation films
1978 independent films
1970s slasher films
British exploitation films
British horror films
British independent films
British slasher films
Films about rape
Films set in the Lake District
Films set in hotels
Films shot in Cumbria
1970s English-language films
Films directed by Alan Birkinshaw
1970s British films